
Lake Zug is a lake in Central Switzerland, situated between Lake Lucerne and Lake Zurich. It stretches for 14 km between Arth and the Cham-Zug bay. The Lorze as the main feeder river empties its waters into the lake at its northern extremity, but 1 km (0.6 mi) further west issues from the lake to pursue its course towards the Reuss. Due to this poor feeding, Environmental protection is very important as the lake would suffer long term damage if polluted as the second of the rivers, Rigiaa, feeds only a marginal amount into the lake at its southern end. Already a great part of the fauna in the deep parts of the lake has been lost.

Background

Toward the south-west extremity of the lake the Rigi descends rather steeply to the water's edge, while part of its east shore forms a narrow level band at the foot of the 1,583 m (5,194 ft) Rossberg, and the Zugerberg. The culminating point of the lake's drainage basin is the summit of the Rigi at 1,798 m.

At its northern end, the shores are nearly level, while on the west shore the wooded promontory of Buonas (with its castles, old and new) projects picturesquely into the waters. The principal place on the lake is the town of Zug. Three railways follow the shore of the lake, one from Zurich via Zug and Arth-Goldau to the St Gotthard, one from Lucerne via Arth-Goldau to the St Gotthard, and the third from Zurich via Zug to Lucerne.

Many fish (including pike and carp of considerable weights) are taken in the lake, which is especially famous for an endemic kind of trout (Salmo salvelinus, locally called Rolheli).

History 
The first steamer was placed on the lake in 1852.

In the early 20th century, a railway (formerly part of the St. Gotthard main route) ran along its eastern shore past Walchwil to Arth at its south end, which was connected initially by a steam tramway with the Arth-Goldau station of the St Gotthard line.

Settlements 
Arth
Gängigen
Buonas
Cham
Chämleten
Immensee
Risch
Walchwil
Zug
Lorzen
Oberwil

Public Transportation 

Public transportation on Lake Zug is done by the  Zugersee Schifffahrt / Schifffahrtsgesellschaft für den Zugersee AG (SGZ) .

References

External links
 Zugersee Schifffahrt lake cruises

 
Zug
Zug
Zug
Zug
LZug
Lucerne–Schwyz border
Lucerne–Zug border
Schwyz–Zug border
Zug